Kupe's Sail is a geological formation near the eastern end of Palliser Bay at the southern end of the North Island of New Zealand.

It is composed of sedimentary rock which has been thrust up in an earthquake, resulting in a characteristic flat triangular ridge having the appearance of the kind of sail regularly used by Pacific explorers such as Kupe.

References
1966 Encyclopedia of New Zealand
The Great New Zealand Maritime Heritage Trail

Rock formations of the Wellington Region